Diaphus nielseni is a species of lanternfish found in the Indo-Pacific.

Size

Etymology
The fish is named  in honor of Jørgen G. Nielsen (b. 1932), the Curator of Fishes, at the Zoological Museum of Copenhagen, to whom Nafpaktitis was most grateful for his hospitality and his help during the long period of study of the Dana Collections, which are stored at Nielsen's museum.

References

Myctophidae
Taxa named by Basil Nafpaktitis
Fish described in 1978